Neil Fairbrother (born Neil Harvey Fairbrother; 9 September 1963) is an English former cricketer who played 75 One Day International matches and 10 Test matches as a batsman for England. Fairbrother, named by his mother after her favourite player, the Australian cricketer Neil Harvey, was educated at Lymm Grammar School and played his county cricket for Lancashire. Although primarily a one day player at international level, he had strong success in the County Championship and had a first class high score of 366.

Fairbrother retired from all cricket in 2002, and became Director of Cricket at International Sports Management. He was also a player manager for a time, managing among others Andrew Flintoff. In February 2018, Fairbrother set up Phoenix Management.

Domestic career
Fairbrother played for Lancashire, Transvaal and England. He was team captain of Lancashire in 1992–1993. Cricket writer, Colin Bateman, described Fairbrother as "an inventive, intelligent left-hander".

In 1990, Fairbrother scored 366 for Lancashire against Surrey at The Oval. 311 of his runs came in a single day, and his feat is unique in that he scored at least 100 runs in each of the three sessions that day. Another milestone came in 1998, when he became the first man to play in ten Lord's one-day domestic cricket cup finals.  Fairbrother finished on the winning side in seven of these finals, including the Benson and Hedges Cup in 1984, when he top-scored for his side aged 20, and both the Benson and Hedges Cup and NatWest Trophy in both 1990 and 1996. He also helped Lancashire to success in the Refuge Assurance Cup in 1988 and the National League (formerly the Refuge Assurance League) in 1989 and 1999.

International career
Fairbrother made his international debut on 2 April 1987, in a One Day International against India. Following a match-winning century against a West Indies side including Malcolm Marshall, Curtly Ambrose and Courtney Walsh at Lord's in 1991, he established himself as a regular in middle-order of the one-day side for several years. Test success, however, proved elusive. Bowled for a duck on his debut, he made just ten Test appearances for England, with only one half-century from 15 innings, at an average of 15.64. However, his international honours included appearing for England in three Cricket World Cups. Chief among the world cup appearances was the 1992 World Cup Final where Fairbrother topscored for England with a gritty 62 off 70 balls and almost pulled off an improbable chase.

References

External links 
 
 
 Neil Fairbrother: 12 facts about the Lancashire stalwart Chinmay Jawalekar, Cricket Country, September 9, 2015

1963 births
Living people
Cricketers at the 1992 Cricket World Cup
Cricketers at the 1996 Cricket World Cup
Cricketers at the 1999 Cricket World Cup
Cricketers from Warrington
England One Day International cricketers
England Test cricketers
English cricketers
Gauteng cricketers
Lancashire cricket captains
Lancashire cricketers
Marylebone Cricket Club cricketers